This was the first edition of the tournament.

Steve Johnson won the title after defeating Stefano Travaglia 7–6(7–2), 7–6(7–3) in the final.

Seeds
All seeds receive a bye into the second round.

Draw

Finals

Top half

Section 1

Section 2

Bottom half

Section 3

Section 4

References

External links
Main draw
Qualifying draw

2020 ATP Challenger Tour